Oberstabsfeldwebel (OStFw or OSF) is the highest Non-commissioned officer (NCO) rank in German Army and German Air Force. It is grouped as OR9 in NATO, equivalent to a Sergeant Major in the United States Army and a Warrant Officer Class 1 in the British Army. Attainment of this rank requires at least sixteen years since promotion to feldwebel and at least six years since promotion to hauptfeldwebel

In army/ air force context NCOs of this rank were formally addressed as Herr Oberstabsfeldwebel also informally / short Oberstaber.

The rank was introduced in the German Heer equivalent to the Marine grade Oberstabsbootsmann in 1955, and belongs to the grad group Unteroffiziere mit Portepee.

History
The rank is a comparatively new rank, and had not been used by any German military prior to in 1955.

Rank sequence
The sequence of ranks (top-down approach) in that particular group ([[Unteroffiziere mit Portepee|Senior NCOs with portepee]]) is as follows:
OR-9: Oberstabsfeldwebel / Oberstabsbootsmann
OR-8: Stabsfeldwebel / Stabsbootsmann
OR-7: Hauptfeldwebel / Hauptbootsmann
OR-6a: Oberfeldwebel / Oberbootsmann
OR-6b: Feldwebel / Bootsmann

References

Sources 
BROCKHAUS, Die Enzyklopädie in 24 Bänden (1796–2001), Band 5: 3-7653-3665-3, S. 487, Definition: Oberstabsfeldwebel
BROCKHAUS, Die Enzyklopädie in 24 Bänden (1796–2001), Band 7: 3-7653-3676-9, S. 185, Oberstabsfeldwebel

Military ranks of Germany